is a Japanese idol, actress, and YouTuber. She is best known for being the former voice actress of Aya Maruyama from BanG Dream! and as a former member of Super Girls.

Biography 
After passing "avex Idol Audition 2010" on 12 June 2010, Maeshima became a member of the Japanese idol group, Super Girls. As a member, she was given the nickname "Amita" (あみた) and assigned rose pink as her image color. In 2011, she started taking on solo activities in parallel with the Supaga's activities, releasing exclusive modeling and solo photo collections for Pichi Lemon, performing in TV dramas,  lending her voice as an anime voice actor, and filming commercials. On 25 June 2016, Maeshima succeeded group member Rika Shimura as the third group leader of Supaga.

On 31 March 2017, Maeshima graduated from Supaga in order to focus on her voice acting career. She debuted as the voice of BanG Dream! Aya Maruyama the next month.

On 30 November 2022, it was announced that Maeshima would go on hiatus from all entertainment activities due to health issues. As a result, she terminated her contract with Avex Inc. and she stepped down from her roles as Aya Maruyama in BanG Dream! and Ibuki Niijima in D4DJ.

Filmography

Theatre

Anime

TV dramas

Radio

Multimedia projects

Discography

As Super Girls

As Pastel Palettes

References

External links 
 Official website
 (in Japanese)

Living people
1997 births
Japanese idols
21st-century Japanese actresses
People from Saitama Prefecture